Klinsky Uyezd (Клинский уезд) was one of the subdivisions of the Moscow Governorate of the Russian Empire. It was situated in the northern part of the governorate. Its administrative centre was Klin.

Demographics
At the time of the Russian Empire Census of 1897, Klinsky Uyezd had a population of 115,162. Of these, 99.7% spoke Russian and 0.1% Latvian as their native language.

References

 
Uezds of Moscow Governorate
Moscow Governorate